The following is a list of the MTV Movie Award winners and nominees for Best Action Sequence. This award was last given out in 2005.

Notes

References

MTV Movie & TV Awards